The Biographical Treasury, a dictionary of universal biography (London, 1854) was a reference book written and published by British author Samuel Maunder. It reached a 13th edition in 1866, when it was rewritten by William Leist Readwin Cates.

Structure

The biographies in the book were arranged in alphabetical order. A detailed bibliography was provided at the end of the book.

Reception

The book, essentially a who's who of important persons in Britain at that time, was one of the most popular books of the 19th century. It has proven to be popular even in the 20th century, and is available in several libraries worldwide.

Notes

External links
 archive.org
 archive.org
 hathitrust.org
 worldcat.org
 openlibrary.org
 openlibrary.org
 biblio.com
 biblio.com

1854 books
Biographical dictionaries